Luzula nivea, commonly known as snow-white wood-rush, snowy wood-rush and lesser wood-rush, is a species of perennial plant in Juncaceae family.

The plant is native to Southwestern and Central Europe, including the Alps and Pyrenees.

Description

Cultivation
Luzula nivea is cultivated as an ornamental grass, for planting in gardens. In some climates it can escape from gardens to become an invasive species.

Gallery

References

nivea
Flora of Central Europe
Flora of Southwestern Europe
Flora of the Alps
Flora of the Pyrenees
Flora of Austria
Flora of France
Flora of Germany
Flora of Slovenia
Flora of Spain
Garden plants of Europe